This is a list of politicians of Jewish origin divided between their respective countries and those serving as heads of state and government.

Jewish politicians by country
 Austria
 Canada
 France
 Germany
 Israel (Includes non-Jewish politicians)
 Poland
 Russia
 South-east European
 United Kingdom
 United States

Jewish heads of state and government
 List of Jewish heads of state and government

Politics by country